Admiral of the Fleet Sir John Michael de Robeck, 1st Baronet,  (10 June 1862 – 20 January 1928) was an officer in the Royal Navy. In the early years of the 20th century he served as Admiral of Patrols, commanding four flotillas of destroyers.

De Robeck commanded the allied naval force in the Dardanelles during the First World War. His campaign to force the straits, launched on 18 March 1915, was nearly successful, as the Turkish land-based artillery almost ran out of ammunition. However, mines laid in the straits led to the loss of three allied battleships. The subsequent ground campaign, like the naval campaign, was ultimately a failure and the ground troops had to be taken off the Gallipoli peninsula by de Robeck on the night of 8 January 1916. He went on to become Commander of the 3rd Battle Squadron of the Grand Fleet and then Commander of the 2nd Battle Squadron of the Grand Fleet.

After the war de Robeck became Commander-in-Chief of the Mediterranean Fleet and British High Commissioner to Turkey, and then Commander-in-Chief of the Atlantic Fleet.

Naval career

Early career
Born the son of John Henry Edward Fock, 4th Baron de Robeck (a member of the Swedish nobility) and Zoë Sophia Charlotte Fock (née Burton), de Robeck joined the Royal Navy as a cadet in the training ship HMS Britannia on 15 July 1875. Promoted to midshipman on 27 July 1878, he joined the frigate  in the Channel Squadron in July 1878 and then transferred to the training ship  at Portsmouth in April 1882. Promoted to sub-lieutenant on 27 July 1882, he joined the gunnery school HMS Excellent in August 1882 before transferring to the gunboat  on the China Station in August 1883. Promoted to lieutenant on 30 September 1885, he transferred to the battleship , flagship of the Commander-in-Chief, China in early 1886, to the brig  in March 1887 and to the battleship , flagship of the Channel Squadron, in November 1887. He joined the staff of the training ship HMS Britannia in September 1888 and then transferred to the armoured cruiser , flagship of the China Station, in January 1891 before returning to the staff of the training ship HMS Britannia in August 1893.

De Robeck became gunnery officer in the corvette  on the North America and West Indies Station in November 1895 and, following promotion to commander on 22 June 1897, became commanding officer of the destroyer  at Chatham in July 1897, next the destroyer  at Chatham in July 1898 and then the destroyer  at Chatham in June 1899. After that he became executive officer in the cruiser  in the Mediterranean Fleet in June 1900.

He temporarily commissioned  for short while during summer 1902, waiting for Warrior to be ready from an extensive refit. He became commanding officer of the armoured cruiser  in the Mediterranean Fleet in August 1906, commanding officer of the battleship  in the Channel Fleet in January 1908 and then inspecting officer of boys' training establishments in January 1910. Promoted to rear admiral on 1 December 1911, he became Admiral of Patrols, commanding four flotillas of destroyers, in April 1912.

First World War
De Robeck received command of the 9th Cruiser Squadron, with his flag in the protected cruiser , in August 1914, just after the start of the First World War. In this position, he captured the German liners SS Schlesien and SS Graecia.

De Robeck became second-in-command, under Admiral Sackville Carden, of the Eastern Mediterranean Squadron (the Allied naval forces in the Dardanelles), with his flag in the battleship , in February 1915. Carden received instructions to force the straits and then push on to Constantinople: he made an unsuccessful attempt to do this on 19 February 1915, but then fell seriously ill, leaving de Robeck to take command, with his flag in the battleship , in March 1915. De Robeck's campaign to force the straits, launched on 18 March 1915, nearly succeeded, as the Turkish land-based artillery almost ran out of ammunition: however, mines laid in the straits led to the loss of three Allied battleships. De Robeck, seeing no sense in losing more ships, then abandoned the whole naval operation. On 25 April 1915 the Royal Navy landed General Ian Hamilton's troops at the tip of the Gallipoli peninsula (Cape Helles) and at Anzac Cove, on the peninsula's western coast. The Ottoman forces and their German advisors had had two months warning from the first serious navy attack to prepare ground defences before the follow-up ground landing could be mounted, and they used the time effectively. The initial landings failed to achieve their objectives, and the Allies made a further unsuccessful attempt, in August 1915, at Suvla Bay. In the wake of this setback, Commodore Roger Keyes, de Robeck's Chief of Staff, argued for a third attempt to force the straits, but de Robeck recommended against it and the Admiralty accepted de Robeck's advice. The ground campaign, like the naval campaign, ultimately proved a failure, and although de Robeck was appointed a Knight Commander of the Order of the Bath for his service in the Gallipoli Campaign on 1 January 1916, he had to organize the evacuation of Hamilton's troops off the Gallipoli peninsula on the night of 8 January 1916.

De Robeck went on to become Commander of the 3rd Battle Squadron of the Grand Fleet, with his flag in the battleship , in May 1916; and Commander of the 2nd Battle Squadron of the Grand Fleet, with his flag in the battleship , in November 1916. He was promoted to vice admiral on 17 May 1917.

After the war

Appointed a Knight Grand Cross of the Order of St Michael and St George on 1 January 1919, de Robeck became Commander-in-Chief, Mediterranean Fleet and British High Commissioner to Turkey, with his flag in the battleship , in July 1919. He was created a baronet on 29 December 1919 and promoted to full admiral on 24 March 1920. Advanced to Knight Grand Cross of the Order of the Bath on 1 January 1921, he went on to be Commander-in-Chief, Atlantic Fleet in August 1922 before retiring in August 1924.

In retirement de Robeck became President of the Marylebone Cricket Club. Appointed a Knight Grand Cross of the Royal Victorian Order in November 1925, he was promoted to Admiral of the Fleet on 24 November 1925 and died at his home in London on 20 January 1928.

Family
In 1922 he married Hilda, Lady Lockhart, widow of Sir Simon Macdonald Lockhart, 5th Baronet; they had no children.

Honours and awards
 Knight Grand Cross of the Order of the Bath – 1 January 1921 (KCB – 1 January 1916)
 Knight Grand Cross of the Order of St Michael and St George – 1 January 1919 
 Knight Grand Cross of the Royal Victorian Order – November 1925
 Knight of Grace of the Venerable Order of Saint John – 29 November 1920
 Grand Officer of the French Legion of Honour – 9 August 1916
 Grand Cross of the Order of the Crown of Italy – 11 August 1917
 Japanese Order of the Sacred Treasure, 1st class – 29 August 1917
 Grand Officer of the Order of the Crown of Romania – 17 March 1919

References

Sources

External links

 Transcription of Official Service Records on www.admirals.org.uk 
 
 
The Papers of Admiral Sir John de Robeck held at Churchill Archives Centre

|-

1862 births
1928 deaths
People from County Kildare
Baronets in the Baronetage of the United Kingdom
Royal Navy admirals of the fleet
Royal Navy admirals of World War I
Knights Grand Cross of the Order of the Bath
Knights Grand Cross of the Order of St Michael and St George
Knights Grand Cross of the Royal Victorian Order
Roebeck, John de
Roebeck, John de
Roebeck, John de
Presidents of the Marylebone Cricket Club